The Centre sportif Bois-de-Boulogne is a soccer centre situated in the city of Laval, a suburb of Montreal, in the province of Quebec in Canada.

Outdoor soccer fields
The centre has six outdoor grounds (in the official dimensions of FIFA), among which two use synthetic turf. One of its grounds possesses terraces that can accommodate 1,000 supporters.

Indoor soccer fields

The  building is completely made out of wood, with nine immense wooden arcs which establish the main part of the structure offer an immense free space. These arcs have a reach of 72 metres and rise up to 20 metres off the ground and represent an architectural feature. During the cold season of the winter, with the permanent indoor ground, an outside synthetic ground near the building is covered with a heated air-supported dome.

The Centre sportif Bois-de-Boulogne possesses the other installations, some of which are a physical conditioning room and two indoor gymnasiums. Volleyball and badminton can be practiced in them. The staff of the centre include elite athletes and highly qualified trainers. Several other services are offered: sports therapy, physiotherapy, sports camps for young boys and girls.

Tournaments
The sports complex welcomes several tournaments of provincial and national level, besides being the permanent residence of the Laval Comets in the W-League.

The Centre sportif Bois-de-Boulogne of Laval also contains the offices of various local soccer associations, and those of the Fédération de soccer du Québec.

References

External links
 
 photos of Centre sportif Bois de Boulogne

Sports venues in Quebec
Buildings and structures in Laval, Quebec
Sport in Laval, Quebec